Another Hand is an album by the American saxophonist David Sanborn, released in 1991.

The album and the title track were nominated for Grammy Awards, in the "Best Jazz Instrumental Performance, Group" and "Best Jazz Instrumental Solo" categories.

Another Hand peaked at No. 170 on the Billboard 200.

Production
The album was produced by Hal Willner and Marcus Miller. The guitarists Marc Ribot and Bill Frisell, the drummer Jack DeJohnette, and the pianist Mulgrew Miller were among the many musicians who contributed to the album. Syd Straw provided vocals on the cover version of the Velvet Underground's "Jesus".

Critical reception

Entertainment Weekly deemed the album "the first Sanborn record to extend beyond his ever-popular R&B-fusion style and really suggest his broad tastes." The Wall Street Journal thought that Bill Frisell's "moody, rubbery guitar sets the tone for a project that permits Sanborn to stretch beyond the saccharine jazz-pop for which he is adored."

The Washington Post wrote: "Often vilified for his fashionable fusion and general sense of accommodation, Sanborn surprised his severest critics with the cinematic sweep of this straight-ahead jazz and blues-inflected album." The Calgary Herald opined that "the kind of icy jazz noodling that David Sanborn favors sets a mind wanderin' to more interesting places." The Indianapolis Star noted that "some of the music cultivates a 'sound' more intently than it explores the individualism of the players, but this will keep the pop contingent of Sanborn's fans happy."

AllMusic wrote that "there's nothing shallow or contrived about the album, an exploratory, heartfelt effort generally defined by his introspective, soulsearching improvisations."

Track listing

Personnel 
 David Sanborn – alto saxophone
 Leon Pendarvis – organ (2)
  Terry Adams – acoustic piano (3, 4, 7, 8)
 Mulgrew Miller – acoustic piano (5, 10)
 Bill Frisell – guitars (1, 2, 7), acoustic guitar (6), electric guitar (9)
 Marc Ribot – guitars (3, 7, 8), electric guitar (6), acoustic guitar (9)
 Al Anderson – guitars (4)
 Dave Tronzo – acoustic guitar (6), guitars (7, 8)
 Charlie Haden – bass (1, 2, 6, 9)
 Greg Cohen – bass (3, 4, 7, 8), arco bass (9), arrangements (9)
 Marcus Miller – bass guitar (5, 10)
 Joey Baron – drums (1, 2, 3, 6-9)
 Steve Jordan – drums (4)
 Jack DeJohnette – drums (5, 10)
 Don Alias – percussion (2, 3, 4, 6-9)
 Lenny Pickett – tenor saxophone (2), horn arrangements (2), contrabass clarinet (9), E flat clarinet (9)
 Art Baron – trombone (2, 9), bass trombone (9)
 Syd Straw – vocals (4, 6)

Production
 Hal Willner – producer (1-4, 6-9)
 Marcus Miller – producer (5, 10)
 Joe Ferla – recording, mixing 
 Shannon Carr – assistant engineer 
 Aaron Krops – assistant engineer 
 David Merrill – assistant engineer 
 David Parla – assistant engineer 
 Gary Solomon – assistant engineer 
 Michael White – assistant engineer 
 Bob Ludwig – mastering at Masterdisk (New York, NY)
 Susan Jacobs – production coordinator 
 Linner Vasoll – personal assistant
 John Purcell – saxophone sound consultant 
 Stephen Byram – art direction, design, cover artwork 
 Roy Volkmann – photography 
 Patrick Rains & Associates – management

References

David Sanborn albums
1991 albums
Elektra Records albums